Michael or Mike Petersen may refer to:

Michael Petersén (game designer), Swedish writer since 1981
Mike Petersen (Kansas politician) (born 1960), American state senator
Mike Petersen (soccer) (born 1965), Australian midfielder
Mike Petersen (Utah politician), American state representative since 2021
Mike Petersen (basketball), basketball coach

See also
Michael Peterson (disambiguation)
Michael Pedersen (disambiguation)